Yunnan Honghe Running Bulls or Yunnan Honghe or Yunnan Running Bulls were a basketball team in the Southern Division of the Chinese Basketball Association (CBA), based in Mengzi, Honghe, Yunnan.

They won the 2004 Chinese Basketball League (CBL) championship and were promoted to the CBA for the 2004–2005 season, replacing the disqualified Beijing Olympians.

In the 2004–2005 season, the Yunnan Running Bulls finished in fourth place in the Southern Division and upset the Northern Division's Liaoning Hunters in the quarter-finals, but lost in the semi-finals to the Jiangsu Dragons. In 2005–2006 they again finished in fourth place in the Southern Division, but were eliminated by the Northern Division's Beijing Ducks in the quarter-finals.

External links
 Official website 
 Sports Sina Club Profile 
Chinese Basketball Association former teams
Sport in Yunnan